The 2013 Canadian Mixed Curling Championship was held from November 15 to 24, 2012 at the Town of Mount Royal Curling Club in Mount Royal, Quebec. This edition marked the fiftieth edition of the Canadian Mixed Curling Championship and the third time that the province of Quebec has hosted the Canadian Mixed Championship. This edition also marked the first time that the qualifying round for relegated teams was implemented in the championship. In the final, Ontario, skipped by Cory Heggestad, defeated Nova Scotia, skipped by Brent MacDougall, with a score of 10–3 in eight ends. Heggestad and his team won their first Canadian Mixed title, and Ontario won its third title in the championships.

The four winning players were invited to play as two separate pairs at the inaugural 2013 Canadian Mixed Doubles Curling Trials, though they did not participate.

Qualifying round
Four associations did not automatically qualify to the championships, and participated in a qualifying round. Two qualification spots were awarded to the two winners of a double knockout round.

Teams
The teams are listed as follows:

Knockout brackets

Knockout results
All draw times are listed in Eastern Standard Time (UTC–5).

First knockout
Thursday, November 15, 2:00 pm

Thursday, March 15, 7:00 pm

Second knockout
Thursday, November 15, 7:00 pm

Friday, November 16, 2:00 pm

Teams
The teams are listed as follows:

Round-robin standings
Final round-robin standings

Round-robin results
All draw times are listed in Eastern Standard Time (UTC–5).

Draw 1
Saturday, November 17, 6:00 pm

Draw 2
Sunday, November 18, 10:00 am

Draw 3
Sunday, November 18, 2:30 pm

Draw 4
Sunday, November 18, 7:00 pm

Draw 5
Monday, November 19, 10:00am

Draw 6
Monday, November 19, 2:30 pm

Draw 7
Monday, November 19, 7:00 pm

Draw 8
Tuesday, November 20, 10:00am

Draw 9
Tuesday, November 20, 2:30 pm

Draw 10
Tuesday, November 20, 7:00 pm

Draw 11
Wednesday, November 21, 10:00am

Draw 12
Wednesday, November 21, 2:30 pm

Draw 13
Wednesday, November 21, 7:00 pm

Draw 14
Thursday, November 22, 10:00am

Draw 15
Thursday, November 22, 2:30 pm

Draw 16
Thursday, November 22, 7:00 pm

Draw 17
Friday, November 23, 9:00am

Playoffs

Semifinal
Friday, November 23, 7:30 pm

Final
Saturday, November 24, 2:00 pm

Awards and honors
The following awards were given:

All-star team
The all-star team was chosen based on the highest player percentage for players at each position.
Skip:  Brent MacDougall
Third:  Cheryl Bernard
Second:  Del Shaughnessy
Lead:  Jane Snyder

Sportsmanship Awards
The sportsmanship awards were given based on votes from all of the players at the competition.
 Brent MacDougall, Nova Scotia skip
 Stephanie Crocker, Northwest Territories third

References

External links
Home Page

2012 in Canadian curling
Mount Royal, Quebec
Canadian Mixed Curling Championship
Curling competitions in Quebec
2012 in Quebec
November 2012 sports events in Canada